Samuel Bridgeland (July 31, 1847 – May 6, 1903) was an Ontario physician and political figure. He represented Muskoka in the Legislative Assembly of Ontario as a Liberal member from 1898 to 1903.

He was born in Downsview, Canada West to provincial surveyor James William Bridgland and educated in Newmarket. He studied medicine at Jefferson Medical College in Philadelphia and then at Queen's University. He set up practice in Bracebridge. In 1873, Bridgeland married Emma Fraser. He died in office in 1903.

References

External links 

1847 births
1903 deaths
Ontario Liberal Party MPPs
Politicians from Toronto